Delia's Gone is a 2022 drama film, written, directed, and produced by Robert Budreau, based upon a short story Caged Bird Sing by Michael Hamblin. It stars Stephan James, Marisa Tomei, Paul Walter Hauser, and Travis Fimmel.

Cast
 Stephan James as Louis
 Marisa Tomei as Francine 'Fran' Cole, the Sheriff of Ledding County and later an Ohio State Highway Patrol detective
 Paul Walter Hauser as Bo Walston, a Deputy and later Sheriff of Ledding County
 Travis Fimmel as Stacker Cole
 Kate Moyer as Rose
 Michelle Giroux as Helena
 Hamza Haq as Larry
 Graham Abbey as Billy

Production
On October 13, 2020, it was announced Stephan James, Marisa Tomei and Paul Walter Hauser had joined the cast of the film. On October 21, 2020, Travis Fimmel joined the cast.

Principal photography began in October 2020.

Release
The film was released in theaters and through video on demand in the United States on August 19, 2022 by Vertical Entertainment.

Awards
David Braid received a Canadian Screen Award nomination for Best Original Song at the 10th Canadian Screen Awards for the song "Ring Them Fantasy".

The film was shortlisted for Best Direction in a Feature Film at the 2022 Directors Guild of Canada awards.

References

External links
 
 
 

2022 films
2022 drama films
American drama films
Canadian drama films
English-language Canadian films
Entertainment One films
Films directed by Robert Budreau
2020s Canadian films
2020s American films